The Labor Federation of Government Related Organizations (LAFGO; , Seiroren) is a trade union representing workers at quangos in Japan.

The union was founded on 2 November 1960, as the Council of Special Governmental Corporations Workers' Unions (Seirokyo).  It affiliated to the General Council of Trade Unions of Japan, and by 1970 it had 10,161 members.  From the late 1980s, it was affiliated to the Japanese Trade Union Confederation, and in 1991 it became Seiroren.  By 1996, its membership had grown to 33,392.  In 2001, it became part of the new Japan Public Sector Union, while maintaining its organisation.

External links

References

Public sector trade unions
Trade unions established in 1960
Trade unions in Japan